Tagwana–Djimini are a branch of the Senufo languages of Côte d'Ivoire.

 
Languages of Burkina Faso
Senufo languages